LG Philips can refer to two partnerships between South Korea's LG Group and the Dutch firm Philips:

LG Philips Display
LG.Philips LCD